Adelante (Forward) was an anarchist weekly workers newspaper published from Santander, Spain 1902–1903. The first issue was published on May 1, 1902. The newspaper survived until the end of March 1903. Adelante was noted for its hostility towards the Spanish Socialist Workers' Party, expressed through the rivalry with the socialist organ La Voz del Pueblo. In total 42 issues of Adelante were published.

References

1902 establishments in Spain
1903 disestablishments in Spain
Defunct newspapers published in Spain
Mass media in Santander, Spain
Weekly newspapers published in Spain
Publications established in 1902
Publications disestablished in 1903
Spanish-language newspapers